Duke Blue Devils Softball joined the Atlantic Coast Conference as a Division I varsity program in 2017.  In July 2015, former Big Ten Player of the Year Marissa Young was named as Duke University's first head softball coach. Young spent the previous two years as an assistant coach at the University of North Carolina.

History

Coaching history

Coaching staff

Year-by-year record

See also
List of NCAA Division I softball programs

References